Table Top Wilderness is a protected wilderness area centered around its namesake Table Top Mountain, a summit of 4,373 feet (1332 m) in the Table Top Mountains in the U.S. state of Arizona.  Established in 1990 under the Arizona Desert Wilderness Act the area is managed by the Bureau of Land Management. It is located in the Sonoran Desert National Monument south of Interstate 8 between the towns of Casa Grande and Gila Bend. The flat-topped mesa rises from the desert floor in Vekol Valley to the east surrounded by smaller canyons and desert washes with views of the desert plain in all directions.  There are two established trails in the wilderness area, one of which leads to the summit.

The area is a typical Sonoran Desert ecosystem with vegetation that includes saguaro cactus, palo verde, ironwood trees, bursage, and creosote bushes.

See also
 List of Arizona Wilderness Areas
 List of U.S. Wilderness Areas

References

External links
 Table Top Trail – BLM
  – Little Table Top (summit)
  – Table Top (summit)
  – Table Top Mountains (summit)
  – Table Top Wilderness (reserve)

IUCN Category Ib
Wilderness areas of Arizona
Protected areas of Maricopa County, Arizona
Protected areas established in 1990
1990 establishments in Arizona